= Chi yan teng kong =

Painting by Wu You-ru

Chi yan teng kong (赤焰騰空), literally meaning "red flame take off", was a painting by Wu You-ru (吳友如) that it is claimed depicted the first graphical account of a UFO incident in Qing dynasty China.

== Description ==
The painting showed crowds gathered near Nanjing's Confucius temple looking up at a "fireball" in the sky. The incident occurred in 1892, which is reported as the 18th year of the Guangxu Emperor's reign. Wu You-ru wrote the date and time on the painting as the 9th month 28th day, 8pm. The month reported is likely not the Gregorian calendar, since the Chinese calendar was used up until the end of the Qing era.
